Penumanchili is a village in West Godavari district in the state of Andhra Pradesh in India.

Demographics
 India census, Penumanchili has a population of 3924 of which 1984 are males while 1940 are females. The average sex ratio of Penumanchili village is 978. The child population is 392, which makes up 9.99% of the total population of the village, with sex ratio 876. In 2011, the literacy rate of Penumanchili village was 74.04% when compared to 67.02% of Andhra Pradesh.

See also 
 West Godavari district

References 

Villages in West Godavari district